The Hyco River (Tutelo: Hiḳaatmani:) is a tributary of the Dan River, which is a tributary of the Roanoke River.  All three rivers flow through the U.S. states of North Carolina and Virginia.  In Person County, North Carolina the Hyco River is impounded by a dam, forming Hyco Lake. The main part of the river flows through Allensville, North Carolina (a township of Roxboro), on Gentry's Ridge and Mill Creek roads as it flows into Virginia townships such as Alton, Virginia, and Cluster Springs, Virginia, then combining with the Dan River.

According to the USGS the Hyco River has been known by the variant names Hicootomony Creek, Hy Coyee River, Hyco Creek, and Hyco-o-tee River.

See also
List of rivers of Virginia

References

Rivers of Person County, North Carolina
Rivers of North Carolina
Rivers of Virginia
Rivers of Halifax County, Virginia
Tributaries of the Roanoke River